Arne Amundsen (7 August 1952 – 6 September 2014) was a Norwegian football goalkeeper who spent the bulk of his career at Lillestrøm SK. He also played for Lyn and Strømmen. He was nicknamed "Maler'n" ("The Painter") because he worked as a housepainter outside football.

Amundsen made his top level debut for Lyn in 1972. He joined Lillestrøm ahead of the 1977 season. At Lillestrøm, Amundsen won the Norwegian First Division (first tier) twice, and played in the Norwegian Cup final six times, winning the competition four times. He left Lillestrøm at the end of the 1987 season after losing his place in the team to Frode Grodås, and joined local rivals Strømmen. He retired after the 1989 season, having played a total of 459 first-team matches (including friendlies) in his career.

References

External links 
 

1952 births
2014 deaths
Norwegian footballers
Lyn Fotball players
Lillestrøm SK players
Strømmen IF players
Association football goalkeepers